is a railway station in Sumida, Tokyo, Japan, operated by the private railway operator Tobu Railway.

Lines
Hikifune Station is served by the Tobu Skytree Line and Tōbu Kameido Line, and is located 2.4 km from the Tokyo terminus at Asakusa Station. It is also where the Skytree line and trains going to Oshiage Station and the Tokyo Metro Hanzōmon Line split. All kinds of the limited express have stopped at this station since 6 June 2020.

Station layout

This station consists of two island platforms serving four tracks for the Tobu Skytree Line. For the Tobu Kameido Line, the station consists of a terminating single side platform serving one track.

Platforms

Adjacent stations
All kinds of the limited express excluding Urban Park Liner and Skytree Liner stop at this station at only the morning and evening.

History

The station opened on 1 April 1902.

Passenger statistics
In fiscal 2012, the station was used by an average of 24,135 passengers daily.

References

External links

 Tobu station information 

Railway stations in Japan opened in 1902
Tobu Skytree Line
Stations of Tobu Railway
Railway stations in Tokyo